Abreu may refer to:
Abreu (surname)

Places 
University "Marta Abreu" of Las Villas, university located in Santa Clara, Cuba
Abreu Vineyards, a winery in Napa Valley, USA
Abreu Camp, a settlement within Philmont Scout Ranch, New Mexico, USA
Abreu e Lima, Pernambuco, municipality in the state of Pernambuco, Brazil
Bento de Abreu, municipality  in the state of São Paulo, Brazil
Casimiro de Abreu, Rio de Janeiro, municipality in the state of Rio de Janeiro, Brazil
Abreu in Puerto Plata province, Dominican Republic

Companies
Viagens Abreu, the world's oldest travel agency, as well as the largest travel organization in Portugal

Other 
 Abreugraphy, or chest photofluorography, a photofluorography technique for mass screening for tuberculosis